LFRD may refer to:
 Lycée Français René Descartes (disambiguation), various schools
 The ICAO code of Dinard–Pleurtuit–Saint-Malo Airport